Yueya Lake is a lake near Nanjing.

References

Welcome to Baixia,Nanjing at njbx.gov.cn

Lakes of Jiangsu